The 53 cardinal electors in the 1922 papal conclave are listed by region, and within each alphabetically by country. Seven out of the sixty electors did not participate, three for reasons of health: José María Martín de Herrera y de la Iglesia, Giuseppe Antonio Ermenegildo Prisco, and Lev Skrbenský z Hříště. Joaquim Arcoverde de Albuquerque Cavalcanti of São Sebastião do Rio de Janeiro knew he could not reach Rome in time for the conclave and did not attempt the journey. The other three non-European cardinals–William Henry O'Connell of Boston, Denis Dougherty of Philadelphia, and Louis-Nazaire Bégin of Québec City–did not arrive in time to participate in the conclave. Within a month of his election, Pope Pius XI lengthened the waiting period before the start of a papal conclave to allow cardinals from distant places to participate in the balloting.

Roman Curia
Gaetano Bisleti, Prefect of Seminaries and Universities, Cardinal-Protodeacon
Ottavio Cagiano de Azevedo, Chancellor of the Holy Roman Church
Giovanni Cagliero, SDB, Cardinal-Bishop of Frascati
Pietro Gasparri, Secretary of State, Camerlengo of the Holy Roman Church
Francis Aidan Gasquet, OSB, Librarian of Vatican Library, Archivist of Vatican Secret Archives (origin: United Kingdom)
Oreste Giorgi, Major Penitentiary
Gennaro Granito Pignatelli di Belmonte, Cardinal-Bishop of Albano
Gaetano de Lai, Secretary of Consistorial
Camillo Laurenti, Consultor of Oriental Churches
Michele Lega, Prefect of Discipline of the Sacraments
Niccolò Marini, Secretary of Oriental Churches
Rafael Merry del Val, Secretary of Holy Office (origin: Spanish, though born and raised in England)
Vittorio Ranuzzi de' Bianchi, Papal majordomo
Willem van Rossum, CSSR, Prefect of Propagation of the Faith (origin: Netherlands)
Donato Sbarretti, Prefect of Council
Raffaele Scapinelli di Léguigno, Prefect emeritus of Religious
Augusto Silj, Prefect of Apostolic Signatura
Giovanni Tacci Porcelli, Prefect emeritus of Pontifical Household
Teodoro Valfre di Bonzo, Prefect of Religious
Vincenzo Vannutelli, Dean of the College of Cardinals
Antonio Vico, Prefect of Rites

Europe

Italy
Alessio Ascalesi, CPPS, Archbishop of Benevento
Bartolomeo Bacilieri, Bishop of Verona
Tommaso Pio Boggiani, OP, Emeritus Archbishop of Genoa
Pietro La Fontaine, Patriarch of Venice
Giuseppe Francica-Nava di Bontifé, Archbishop of Catania
Alessandro Lualdi, Archbishop of Palermo
Pietro Maffi, Archbishop of Pisa
Alfonso Mistrangelo, SchP, Archbishop of Florence
Basilio Pompili, Vicar General of Rome
Francesco Ragonesi, Nuncio emeritus to Spain
Achille Ratti, Archbishop of Milan (was elected Pope and chose the name Pius XI)
Agostino Richelmy, Archbishop of Turin

France
Pierre Andrieu, Archbishop of Bordeaux
Louis Billot, SJ
Louis-Ernest Dubois, Archbishop of Paris
Louis Luçon, Archbishop of Reims
Louis-Joseph Maurin, Archbishop of Lyon

Spain
Juan Benlloch y Vivó, Archbishop of Burgos
Juan Soldevilla y Romero, Archbishop of Zaragoza
Francisco Vidal y Barraquer, Archbishop of Tarragona

Germany
Adolf Bertram, Archbishop of Breslau
Michael von Faulhaber, Archbishop of Münich und Freising
Karl Joseph Schulte, Archbishop of Cologne

Austria
Andreas Franz Frühwirth, OP, Nuncio emeritus to Bavaria
Friedrich Gustav Piffl, CCRSA, Archbishop of Vienna

United Kingdom of Great Britain and Ireland
Francis Bourne, Archbishop of Westminster
Michael Logue, Archbishop of Armagh, Cardinal-Protopriest (at the time of the conclave, the self-proclaimed Irish Republic was fighting for self-rule in the Irish War of Independence, but it was unrecognised by the international community)

Poland
Edmund Dalbor, Archbishop of Gniezno and Poznań
Aleksander Kakowski, Archbishop of Warsaw

Belgium
Désiré-Joseph Mercier, Archbishop of Mechelen

Hungary
János Csernoch, Archbishop of Esztergom

Portugal
António Mendes Bello, Patriarch of Lisbon

References

 Republished by Muriwai Books, 2017.

Pope Benedict XV
Pope Pius XI
1922